Khasraj-e Beyt-e Qashem is a village in Karkheh Rural District, Hamidiyeh District, Ahvaz County, Khuzestan Province, Iran. At the 2006 census, its population was 26, in 5 families.

References 

Populated places in Ahvaz County